Rohidin Mersyah (born 9 January 1970) is an Indonesian politician who has served as governor of Bengkulu since December 2018.

Early life
Mersyah was born in the village of Gelumbang, in Manna, South Bengkulu, on 9 January 1970 as the fifth child of nine. He completed his basic education in South Bengkulu, before studying veterinary medicine at Gadjah Mada University.

Career
In 2010, Mersyah ran as a vice-regent candidate for the South Bengkulu Regency. Initially, him and the regent candidate Reskan Effendi lost the election with just 48.06% of votes, but following a lawsuit to the Constitutional Court their opponent was disqualified as he had previously been jailed for murder and was hence ineligible as a candidate. He ran as a deputy gubernatorial candidate in the 2015 election, and won the election.

Bengkulu's governor following the election, Ridwan Mukti, was arrested by the Corruption Eradication Commission in June 2017 due to alleged bribery. Mersyah was sworn in as full governor on 10 December 2018.

He was reelected as governor following the 2020 gubernatorial election.

References

Living people
1970 births
Golkar politicians
People from Bengkulu
Mayors and regents of places in Bengkulu
Governors of Bengkulu
Gadjah Mada University alumni